Magor may refer to the following:

Places
 Magor, Monmouthshire, a village in Wales, United Kingdom
 Magor with Undy, a community in Wales, United Kingdom
 Magor Farm, a Romano-British villa near Illogan in Cornwall
 Breton name for Magoar
 Cornish name for Maker, Cornwall

People
 Liz Magor, a Canadian visual artist
 Ivan Martin Jirous, a Czech underground poet, known as Magor
 Magor, a legendary ancestor of the Hungarian people, see Hunor and Magor